The following is a list of notable events and releases that happened in Scandinavian music in 2023. (Go to last year in Scandinavian music or next year in Scandinavian music.)

Events
13 January – The world premiere of the Sinfonia concertante of Esa-Pekka Salonen takes place at the NOSPR Concert Hall in Katowice, Poland, inaugurating the hall's new organ, with Iveta Apkalna as the soloist and the NOSPR conducted by the composer.
11 February – Faroese singer Reiley wins the 53rd Dansk Melodi Grand Prix at Arena Næstved and becomes Denmark's entry for the Eurovision Song Contest

Albums released

January

February

March

Eurovision Song Contest
 Denmark in the Eurovision Song Contest 2023
 Finland in the Eurovision Song Contest 2023
 Iceland in the Eurovision Song Contest 2023
 Norway in the Eurovision Song Contest 2023
 Sweden in the Eurovision Song Contest 2023

Classical works
 Esa-Pekka Salonen – Sinfonia concertante for organ and orchestra

Film and television music

Deaths
9 January – Magnar Mangersnes, Norwegian organist and choral conductor, 84
15 January – Doris, Swedish pop singer, 75
28 January – Odd Børre, Norwegian Eurovision singer, 83
23 February – Slim Borgudd, Swedish racing driver and drummer (Lea Riders Group), 76
8 March – Josua Madsen, Danish drummer, 45 (traffic accident)

References

Scandinavian
Scandinavian culture